Jogia is a surname. Notable people with the surname include:

Avan Jogia (born 1992), Canadian actor, singer, writer, director, and activist
Kunal Jogia (born 1984), British cricketer
Shailesh Jogia (born 1975), British snooker player

See also
Jõgi